Chevauchée of Edward III may refer to:
Chevauchée of Edward III of 1339, in Northern France
Chevauchée of Edward III in 1346, in Northern France
A planned chevauchée of Edward III in 1356, from Calais into Northern France, which did not proceed
Burnt Candlemas, a chevauchée of Edward III through Lothian, Scotland in 1356
Chevauchée of Edward III in 1359-1360, in Northern France